Clipperton may refer to:

Clipperton Island, an island in the eastern Pacific Ocean off the coast of Central America
 Clipperton crab, Johngarthia planata, a species of land crab found on Clipperton Island
Clipperton Fracture Zone, a geological submarine fracture zone of the Pacific Ocean
John Clipperton (1676–1722), English buccaneer, namesake of Clipperton Island